In the history of Brunei, the Sultanate of Brunei (Jawi: كسلطانن بروني) or simply Brunei was a Malay sultanate, centred in Brunei on the northern coast of Borneo island in Southeast Asia. Brunei became a sovereign state around the 15th century, when it grew substantially after the fall of Malacca to the Portuguese, extending throughout coastal areas of Borneo and the Philippines, before it declined in the 17th and 18th centuries. The first ruler or sultan of Brunei was a Muslim. It became a British protectorate in the 19th century.

Historiography 
Understanding the history of the old Bruneian Sultanate is quite difficult since it is hardly mentioned in contemporary sources of its time, as well as there being a scarcity of evidence of its nature. No local or indigenous sources exist to provide evidence for any of this. As a result, Chinese texts have been relied on to construct the history of early Brunei. Boni in Chinese sources most likely refers to Western Borneo, while Poli (婆利), probably located in Sumatra, is claimed by local authorities to refer to Brunei as well.

History

Pre-sultanate history

In the 1300s the Chinese annals, Nanhai zhi, reported that Brunei invaded or administered Sarawak and Sabah as well as the Philippine kingdoms of: Butuan, Sulu, Ma-i (Mindoro), Malilu (present-day Manila), Shahuchong (present-day Siocon or Zamboanga), Yachen (Oton, once part of the Madja-as Kedatuan), and Wenduling (present-day Mindanao), which would regain their independence at a later date. It eventually evolved to be called Pon-i and it was a vassal-state to the Javanese-centered Majapahit Empire.

In the 14th century, Brunei seems to be subjected to Java. The Javanese manuscript Nagarakretagama, written by Prapanca in 1365, mentioned Barune as the vassal state of Majapahit, which had to make an annual tribute of 40 katis of camphor.

After Majapahit invaded Brunei, its subject kingdoms in the Philippines which was formally under its empire, rebelled against Brunei, chief of which was the former kingdom of Sulu which besieged and pillaged it.

Expansion 

Following the presence of Portuguese after the fall of Malacca, Portuguese merchants traded regularly with Brunei from 1530 and described the capital of Brunei as surrounded by a stone wall.

During the rule of Bolkiah, the fifth sultan, the empire held control over coastal areas of northwest Borneo (present-day Brunei, Sarawak and Sabah) and reached Seludong (present-day Manila) and the Sulu Archipelago, including parts of the island of Mindanao. In the 16th century, the Brunei empire's influence extended as far as Kapuas River delta in West Kalimantan. The Malay Sultanate of Sambas in West Kalimantan and the Sultanate of Sulu in southern Philippines in particular developed dynastic relations with the royal house of Brunei. Even the Muslim Rajahs of Manila, Rajah Matanda, for example had family-links with the Brunei Sultanate. Other Malay sultans of Pontianak, Samarinda as far as Banjarmasin, treated the sultan of Brunei as their leader. The true nature of Brunei's relationship with other Malay sultanates of coastal Borneo and the Sulu archipelago is still a subject of study, as to whether it was a vassal state, an alliance, or just a ceremonial relationship. Other regional polities also exercised their influence upon these sultanates. The Sultanate of Banjar (present-day Banjarmasin), for example, was also under the influence of Demak in Java.

Decline 

The rising power of the nearby Sultanate of Sulu occurred due to infighting between Bruneian nobles and the king. Brunei eventually lost its authority over the Bajaus and lapsed into a collection of riverine territories ruled by semi-autonomous chiefs.

By the end of 17th century, Brunei entered a period of decline brought on by internal strife over royal succession, colonial expansion of the European powers, and piracy. The empire lost much of its territory due to the arrival of the western powers such as the Spanish in the Philippines, the Dutch in southern Borneo and the British in Labuan, Sarawak and North Borneo. By 1725, Brunei had many of its supply routes had been taken over by the Sulu sultanate.

In 1888, Sultan Hashim Jalilul Alam Aqamaddin later appealed to the British to stop further encroachment. In the same year, the British signed a "Treaty of Protection" and made Brunei a British protectorate, which lasted until 1984, when Brunei gained independence.

Government 
The sultanate was divided into three traditional land systems known as kerajaan (crown property), kuripan (official property) and tulin (hereditary private property).

References

Sources

Further reading 
 Historical Atlas: History of Brunei
 Expanding Boundaries of Sarawak including territorial gains from the Sultanate of Brunei
 British treaties regarding North Borneo including cession agreement from the Sultanate of Brunei

Former countries in Borneo
Former countries in Bruneian history
Former countries in Malaysian history
Former countries in Philippine history
Former countries in Indonesian history
History of Sarawak
History of Sabah
Former empires in Asia
Former countries
Former sultanates